The Statesman-Examiner is a weekly newspaper based in Colville, Washington. The Statesman-Examiner is distributed every Wednesday. The Statesman-Examiner was established in 1948 as a merger of its predecessors, Statesman-Index (est. 1896) and Colville Examiner (est. 1907). In September 2018, Roger Harnack took over as editor and publisher of the Statesman Examiner. Horizon Publications is the parent company of The Statesman-Examiner. The Statesman-Examiner primarily covers local news, business, and sports.

References

External links 
 Official website: Statesman-Examiner

Newspapers published in Washington (state)
Stevens County, Washington